CDR2 can refer to

 Complementarity-determining region 2 on antibodies
 CDR2 (gene), cerebellar degeneration-related protein 2, a protein expressed by ovarian cancer cells 
 Mitosis inducer protein kinase cdr2, Cdr2 (S. pombe), a protein in the yeast S. pombe